Mont Glacier is a mountain in the Graian Alps, in the Aosta Valley, north-western Italy, approximately 30 km / 19 miles for the border with Switzerland. It has an elevation of  3,185 m.

Part of the Gran Paradiso massif, it commands the valleys and the communes of Champorcher and Champdepraz.

External links
 Mount Glacier, Italy - travel guide

Mountains of the Alps
Mountains of Aosta Valley